State Route 189 (SR 189) is a short  north–south state highway in Crockett County, Tennessee, connecting the towns of Maury City and Friendship.

Route description

SR 189 begins at a Y-intersection with SR 88 in the eastern part of Maury City. It passes through neighborhoods as it heads northwest, then north, to bypass downtown. The highway then leaves Maury City and heads through farmland and rural areas to have an intersection with Reynolds Road, a connector to SR 152. SR 189 continues north through farmland to enter the Friendship city limits, where it comes to an end at an interchange with US 412/SR 20. The highway continues north into downtown, and beyond, as Highway 189, even though this is not maintained by TDOT as SR 189. The entire route of SR 189 is a two-lane highway.

History

SR 189 follows the former alignment of US 412/SR 20 between Maury City and Friendship prior to the four-lane divided highway being built.

Major intersections

References

189
Transportation in Crockett County, Tennessee